The Kermeter is an upland region, up to , which is part of the  Rureifel within the North Eifel in the districts of Aachen, Düren and Euskirchen in the southwestern part of the state of North Rhine-Westphalia in Germany.

The Kermeter ridge is covered by a forest, some 33 km² in area, that is one of the largest contiguous, deciduous forests in the Rhineland. Since 1 January 2004 it has formed the core zone of the Eifel National Park.

Location 
The Kermeter lies on the territory of the three Eifel parishes of Heimbach, Simmerath and Schleiden. It is bordered to the north and west by the Rur Reservoir (around ) and thus by the Rur valley near Heimbach, to the southwest by the Obersee (a pre-basin of the Rur Dam), and in the south by the Urft Reservoir (at around ) and thus the Urft valley. In the southwest the Kermeter transitions into Wolfgarten and Gemünd in the direction of the upper reaches of the Rotbach.

The highest point in the Kermeter is an unnamed rounded summit near Wolfgarten, on which the fire service and observation tower, the Wolfgarten Fire Watchtower (Feuerwachtturm Wolfgarten), stands (a list of other Kermeter hills is given below).

Landscape and nature 

The Kermeter covers an area of 3,592 hectares, of which about 3,300 hectares is a single forested area (the so-called Kermeter-Hochwald or Kermeter High Forest). Beech woods dominate the shaded, damp northern slopes (24%), in places with trees that are over 200 years old. Oak woods hold sway on the drier, southern slopes (26%), interrupted by rocky outcrops (Felsheide). At the start of the 21st century almost half the forest area still consisted of spruce trees, a consequence of reforestation measures after the Second World War. However it is planned that in the long term the spruce stock will be reduced in favour of deciduous woods.

Hills 
Amongst the hills and high points of the Kermeter are the following, according to the Deutsche Grundkarte and sorted by height in metres above sea level: 
 Unnamed summit near Wolfgarten (527.8 m), Euskirchen district; highest hill in the Kermeter; with an observation tower and the Wolfgarten Fire Watchtower (Feuerwachtturm Wolfgarten)
 Hellberg (525.8 m)
 Wildbretshügel (525.3 m), Euskirchen district; good views of the Rur Reservoir
 Theissenberg (522.4 m), Euskirchen district
 Verbrannter Berg (515.5 m); with the Verbrannter Berg ancient forest (Urwald Verbrannter Berg)
 Winterberg (Wolfgarten) (503.4 m); with Kermeterstollen below its western hillside
 Mauelter Berg (502.4 m); with fire watchtower (incl. transmitter) and hunting lodge
 Honigberg (495 m), Kreis Düren district
 Schweizer Berge, slate formation on the southern outskirts of the Urftsee lake (max. 482.2 m)
 Böttenbachsberg (466.6 m)
 Weidenauer Berg (453.3 m), Kreis Düren district
 Adamsberg (443.8 m)
 Altenberg (423.0 m); near Mariawald Abbey
 Griesberg (421.3 m); near Mariawald Abbey
 Winterberg (southern Kermeter) (404.8 m)
 Hohenberg (363.7 m)
 Tonsberg (333.3 m); with ruined castle (cultural monument)

External links

Further reading 
 F. Köhler: Käferfauna in Naturwaldzellen und Wirtschaftswald. Vergleichende Untersuchungen im Waldreservat Kermeter in der Nordeifel. Schriftenreihe LÖBF/LAfAO NRW, Bd. 6, Recklinghausen
 Pfeifer, Maria: Nationalpark Eifel, ThemenTouren Bd. 4, Mit dem Fahrrad durch den Nationalpark Eifel, 1.  Auflage, J.P. Bachem Verlag 2008, 
 Pfeifer, Maria: Der Wildnis-Trail im Nationalpark Eifel, ThemenTouren Bd. 3, Vier Tagesetappen zwischen 18 und 25 km, 1. Auflage, J.P. Bachem Verlag 2007, 
 Pfeifer, Maria: Kurze Wanderungen im Nationalpark Eifel, ThemenTouren Bd. 2, 12 leichte Touren zwischen 2 und 7 km, 2. Auflage J.P. Bachem Verlag 2007, 
 Pfeifer, Maria et al.: Nationalpark Eifel, ThemenTouren Bd. 1, 10 Touren zwischen 5 und 18 km, 4. vollständig überarbeitete Auflage, J.P. Bachem Verlag 2007, 
 NRW-Stiftung/Eifelverein: Nationalpark Eifel, ThemenTouren Bd. 1, 10 Touren zwischen 5 und 18 km, 4. vollständig überarbeitete Auflage, J.P. Bachem Verlag 2007, 
 Herbst im Buchenwald. Kölner Stadtanzeiger vom 29. Oktober 2002
 Eifel Club (publ.): Nationalpark-Karte, Wanderkarte Nr. 50 des Eifelvereins, Maßstab 1:25.000, Verlag des Eifelvereins 2007, 

Mountains and hills of North Rhine-Westphalia
Forests and woodlands of North Rhine-Westphalia
Regions of the Eifel